Kula Ridge can refer to:

Kula-Farallon Ridge
Pacific-Kula Ridge